Jaton flavidus is a species of sea snail, a marine gastropod mollusk in the family Muricidae, the murex snails or rock snails.

Description

Distribution
This marine species occurs off Dakar, Senegal at a depth of ca 10–50 m.

References

 Dakar, Senegal at a depth of ca 10–50 m.

External links
 MNHN, Paris: holotype
 Jousseaume, F., 1874. Description de quelques espèces nouvelles de coquilles appartenant aux genres Murex, Cypraea & Natica. Revue et Magasin de Zoologie Pure et Appliquée (3)2: 3-25
 Vermeij, G. J.; Houart, R. (1996). The genus Jaton (Muricidae, Ocenebrinae), with the description of a new species from Angola, West Africa. Iberus. 14(1): 83-91.,

Ocenebrinae
Gastropods described in 1874